is a Japanese national highway connecting the two cities of Asahikawa and Abashiri in northeastern Hokkaido. The  highway begins at an intersection with National Routes 12 and 40 in Asahikawa. It travels northeast across the northern side of Hokkaido to Abashiri where it ends at an intersection with the paired National Route 244 and National Route 391.

Route description
National Route 39 is a  highway in northern Hokkaido that runs north from Asahikawa to Abashiri. Its southern terminus lies at an intersection in central Asahikawa where it meets National Routes 12 and 40. Along the way from Asahikawa to Abashiri, it passes through the town of Kamikawa and the city of Kitami. Its northern terminus in Abashiri is at an intersection where it meets National Route 244 and National Route 391.

History
National Route 39 was preceded by the Abashiri Road, a Meiji period road built to link the current cities of Asahikawa and Abashiri. Ordered by Genrōin secretary Kaneko Kentarō, construction on the road began in April 1886. It was completed by making use of prison labor from the prisoners that were to be incarcerated at Abashiri Prison in northeastern Hokkaido. The prison laborers were mainly political dissidents that Kaneko viewed as morally deficient. Construction of the Abashiri Road and the others leading from the more-developed southern part of Hokkaido to the prison were of strategic importance to Japan, which viewed Hokkaido as being vulnerable to an invasion from their neighbor, the Russian Empire.

On 4 December 1952 the highway was designated by the Cabinet of Japan as Primary National Highway 39 between Asahikawa and Abashiri. On 1 April 1965 it was reclassified as General National Highway 39 without any changes being made to its routing.

Major junctions
The route lies entirely within Hokkaido.

References

External links

039
Roads in Hokkaido